The 1987–88 Segunda División was the 39th season of the Mexican Segunda División. The season started on 14 August 1987 and concluded on 12 July 1988. It was won by Cobras.

Changes 
 UAT was promoted to Primera División.
 Cobras and León were relegated from Primera División. Before the start of the season Cobras was relocated in Ciudad Juárez.
 SUOO was promoted from Segunda División B. Cachorros Neza won the second promotion place, however, the team board sold its franchise to Petroleros de Salina Cruz.
 Águila Progreso Industrial was promoted from Tercera División.
 Zacatecas, Pachuca and Nuevo Necaxa were relegated from Segunda División.
 U. de C. sold its license to Alacranes Rojos de Apatzingán.
 Progreso de Cocula exchanged its franchise with FEG, team of the Federación de Estudiantes de Guadalajara, a student union of the University of Guadalajara, for this reason the student team took its place in the league, while Progreso was relegated to Tercera División. FEG was affiliated with U. de G.
 Tapatío returned to Guadalajara after one season in Aguascalientes City.

Teams

Group stage

Group 1

Group 2

Group 3

Group 4

Results

Final stage

Group 1

Group 2

Final

Relegation Group

References 

1987–88 in Mexican football
Segunda División de México seasons